The Huntington H-11 Governor was a two-seat cabin monoplane  with a high, cantilever wing built in the United States and first flown around 1930. Three were completed.

Design and Development

The Governor was a side-by-side, cantilever high wing monoplane, designed for business or pleasure. It was unusually aerodynamically clean as its cantilever wing, mounted on top of the fuselage, had no external struts. The wing had a straight leading edge and tapered out to blunted tips.

The fuselage structure was rectangular in section but its  decking was polyangular. The Governor prototype was powered by a  Warner Scarab seven cylinder radial engine, though the  Chevrolet D-4 (later called the Martin 4-333) air-cooled, inverted four cylinder inline or  Kinner B-5 five cylinder radial were options. Pilot and passenger sat side by side behind it in an underwing, windowed cabin accessed by large doors. The tail was conventional with a tailplane, braced from below, on top of the fuselage and a cropped triangular fin and rounded balanced rudder.

The main undercarriage was a split-axle design with the axles from the fuselage central underside. Their outer ends were mounted on V-struts from the lower fuselage longerons. There was a small and semi-enclosed tailwheel.

The date of the Governor's first flight is not known. The prototype was largely complete by the time of the August 1930 Aero Digest article, though its photo shows instrument panel gaps. Three were built, the last a Kinner-powered H-11K, but their later activities are not known.

Specifications

References

High-wing aircraft
Single-engined tractor aircraft
1930s United States sport aircraft
Aircraft first flown in 1930
Conventional landing gear